"You Rock My World" is a song by American singer Michael Jackson from his tenth and final studio album, Invincible (2001). It was released as the lead single from the album on August 22, 2001, by Epic Records.

"You Rock My World" peaked at number 10 on the Billboard Hot 100 and was Jackson's last top-ten song in the United States until "Love Never Felt So Good", which featured Justin Timberlake and peaked at number 9 in 2014. The chart position of "You Rock My World"' was attained solely on airplay alone, as no commercial single was initially issued in the United States. The track reached number one in France, Poland, Portugal, Romania, South Africa, and Spain. It also peaked within the top ten in Australia, Austria, Canada, Denmark, Finland, Germany, Italy, the Netherlands, Sweden, Switzerland, and the United Kingdom. The song was nominated for a Grammy Award for Best Male Pop Vocal Performance at the 44th Grammy Awards.

As part of promotion for "You Rock My World", a music video was released. The video, which is thirteen-and-a-half minutes long, was directed by Paul Hunter and features Chris Tucker and Marlon Brando. In the video, Jackson and Tucker portray men who are trying to gain a woman's affection. The video has been compared to Jackson's previous videos "Smooth Criminal" and "The Way You Make Me Feel".

"You Rock My World" was performed only twice by Jackson: at Madison Square Garden in New York City at concerts on September 7 and 10, 2001, to celebrate Jackson's career as a solo artist. Footage of the performance was shown in the two-hour CBS television special titled Michael Jackson: 30th Anniversary Celebration.

Background
"You Rock My World" was recorded by Michael Jackson for his studio album, Invincible (2001). The song was co-written and composed by Michael Jackson with Darkchild and produced by Jackson and Jerkins. "You Rock My World" was officially released as the lead single from the album in mid-August 2001, by Epic Records. Prior to the single's official release it had been leaked to two New York radio stations on Friday, August 17. Immediately after the songs radio airplay the radio stations had received "a herd of [radio] callers asking for more." "You Rock My World" was first played on WTJM at 6 p.m., with WKTU airing the song 45 minutes later. Both stations had played the single every two hours until around 6 p.m. Saturday, when Jackson's record label, Epic Records, called the program director for both stations, Frankie Blue, who was also a friend of Jackson, and asked him to stop. Blue later recalled, "They informed me of the dangers of playing a song too early." He refused to say how the song came into his possession.

Composition
"You Rock My World" is credited as being an uptempo post-disco and R&B song with vocal harmonies. The song is played in the time signature of common time in the key E minor, with Jackson's vocal range spanning from the tonal nodes of D3 to G5. "You Rock My World" has a moderate tempo of 95 beats per minute. The chord progression in the song is Em7–Am7–D–Em7. The song's composition has been compared to Jackson's previous material with Quincy Jones from the 1970s and 1980s as well as the disco-theme from Jackson's 1979 single "Don't Stop 'Til You Get Enough". Chris Tucker voices the vocal introduction of the song, while all the instruments heard on the track were played by Jackson and Rodney Jerkins. Lyrically, the song's lyrics are about being in love, as well as the effect that it can have, as evident in the opening line: "My life will never be the same, 'cause, girl, you came and changed the way I walk, the way I talk; I cannot explain".

Critical reception
Praise was mainly directed at the song's composition, while dissatisfaction towards the song was expressed by critics because they felt that the track was not Jackson's best material. Stephen Thomas Erlewine of AllMusic listed "You Rock My World" as being a highlight for the Invincible album. Reviewer Andrew Hamilton, also of AllMusic, stated that, "If anybody other than Michael Jackson had released 'You Rock My World' with the tons of publicity and promotion it was accorded, it would have slam dunked the charts and been a multiple award winner. It sold well and got play everywhere, but too many critics panned the song and the album it came from as not being good enough for an artist on Jackson's level." Hamilton commented that people should "give Michael credit" because he was able to maintain a respectable career as a recording artist over the years of his later career.

James Hunter of Rolling Stone praised the song's vocal rhythms as being "finely sculpted" and "exquisite". He noted that the song shows similarities to Jackson's previous material with Quincy Jones. Mark Beaumont, a writer for NME, described the song as being a "disco classic". Catherine Halaby of Yale Daily News stated that the song "showcases the best of 'classic Michael'", and described the song as being "funky, catchy, upbeat, not too creepy". "You Rock My World" was nominated for a Grammy Award for Best Male Pop Vocal Performance at the 44th Grammy Awards, but it lost the award to James Taylor's "Don't Let Me Be Lonely Tonight". It was Jackson's first Grammy nomination since 1997, for his single "Earth Song", and his first nomination in that category since 1995.

Chart performance
"You Rock My World" was commercially successful, generally charting within the top ten on music charts worldwide. The song was one of Jackson's last hit singles in the United States in the final years of his career. "You Rock My World" charted in the top twenty on the Billboard Hot 100 on September 15, 2001. The following week, the song charted at its peak position, number ten. It became Jackson's highest-charting single since his 1995 number-one single, "You Are Not Alone". "You Rock My World" also charted at number seven and thirteen on Billboards Pop chart and R&B/Hip-Hop Songs respectively. Notably, these chart positions were attained based on airplay alone, as no commercial single was issued in the United States. Fred Bronson, Billboard's chart expert at the time, remarked, "Certainly, if a commercial single had been available, it would have peaked higher - perhaps even at no.1". The song also peaked at number two on the Canadian RPM Hot 100 chart.

"You Rock My World" debuted on the United Kingdom Singles Chart at number two, which was its peak position in the country, on October 20. The song remained within the top twenty on the chart for four consecutive weeks, and remained within the top 100 for fifteen consecutive weeks from October 20, 2001, to January 26, 2002. "You Rock My World" debuted on the French Singles Chart on October 13, 2001, at number one. The song remained at number one on the chart for three consecutive weeks, and remained within the top twenty for ten consecutive weeks. The song debuted on the Dutch Singles Charts at number four on October 20, and the following week, charted at its peak position, number two. "You Rock My World" debuted on the Finnish Singles Chart on the forty first week of 2001, at its peak position, number two. After three weeks, the song fell off the charts.

The song debuted at its peak position, number two, in Norway in the 42nd second week of 2001. The song remained on the chart for six consecutive weeks, charting within the top twenty. "You Rock My World" entered New Zealand charts on September 16, at number thirty one. After seven weeks, the song charted at its peak position, number thirteen, and remained on the chart for twelve weeks in 2001. "You Rock My World" debuted on the Australian Singles Chart at its peak position, number four. After the song charted within the top fifty for five consecutive weeks, it fell off the chart, and re-entered two weeks later at number thirty seven, and fell off the chart for the second time on January 6, 2002. "You Rock My World" debuted on the Italian Singles Chart on November 11, at its peak position number three, and remained within the top ten for four weeks in 2001. The song peaked at number two and four on the Belgium Flanders and Walonia charts in 2001. On the Austrian Singles Chart, the song debuted at its peak position, number nine, on October 21, and it remained on the chart for a total of eight weeks.

After Jackson's death in June 2009, "You Rock My World" re-entered music charts worldwide and re-entered Billboard charts for the first time in almost eight years. The song also peaked at number sixty two on Billboards Digital Songs chart on July 11, 2009. The song re-entered the United Kingdom Singles Chart on July 4, charting at number ninety-seven. The following week the song charted at its peak position, number sixty, and charted out of the top 100 after spending three weeks on the chart. "You Rock My World" re-entered the Australian Singles Chart for the third time on July 19, at number fifty. The song remained on the chart for only one week.

Promotion
In late August 2001, Jackson and Sony Music began a promotional campaign for "You Rock My World". As part of promotion for the single, as well as the album, Jackson made a public appearance by celebrating his 43rd birthday—one day late—by presiding over the NASDAQ market opening ceremony in Times Square on Thursday morning, on August 30, 2001. Jackson only performed "You Rock My World" twice. The only performances of "You Rock My World" was during two concerts in early September 2001, which was to celebrate Jackson's 30th year as solo artist, at Madison Square Garden. Tucker, who is part of the song's dialogue and video, was part of the live performance. Footage of the second concert on September 10 was shown in a two-hour television special, titled Michael Jackson: 30th Anniversary Celebration, which was aired on CBS in November of the same year.

Music video
The music video for "You Rock My World" was directed by Paul Hunter and produced by Rubin Mendoza. The video was filmed from August 13 to August 21, 2001, in Los Angeles, California, and was also released in 2001. The video, which is over thirteen minutes long, was described as being a short film. The dance performed during the video consists of fragments from the canceled "Dangerous" music video.

The video consists of Jackson's and Tucker's characters trying to gain the affection of a woman (Kishaya Dudley) by subsequently following her around the neighborhood. Ultimately, a fight breaks out between Jackson and the gang members in a bar, who are ordered by their leader (Michael Madsen) to get rid of Jackson. Jackson, who had begun to perform before the woman, walks up the stage where his backup dancers have arrived. The gang leader causes a disruption by smashing a bottle across the counter, one of the gang members (Billy Drago) proceeds to taunt Jackson, challenging him. A dance scene begins, as a man lights his lighter and one of the gang members uses a knife on Jackson, but Jackson tosses him down. Jackson then punches him in the face, who knocks over a lamp, starting a fire. As the fire spreads, Jackson screams for Tucker, who had been dancing to the song, and he knocks out some of the gang members. During the escape, the woman who met Jackson approaches him outside the bar. The two share a kiss, and Tucker quickly rolls in with a low rider, signaling for Jackson and his new lover to escape, leaving the bar which is consumed in flames.

The video for "You Rock My World" was thought to be the last music video to feature any participation from Jackson before the video for "One More Chance" was unearthed (his following videos would consist of archive footage of himself and others).

The video has been compared to Jackson's previous 1980s music videos for his singles, "Smooth Criminal" (1987), "Bad" (1987), and "The Way You Make Me Feel" (1987), all from his 1987 studio album, Bad. In the video, Jackson can be seen wearing a blazer and his traditional hat. The video features appearances from Marlon Brando, Michael Madsen and Billy Drago.

The video won an NAACP Image Award for Outstanding Music Video at the award show's 2002 ceremony. In several instances in the video, Tucker's character makes several references to previous songs by Michael Jackson, such as "Beat It", "P.Y.T. (Pretty Young Thing)", "The Girl Is Mine", "Bad" ,"Dangerous", and "Billie Jean".

The short version of the music video appears on Number Ones, and the long version appears on Michael Jackson's Vision.

Remix
A remix to the song produced by the Trackmasters was included on Jay Z's 2003 S. Carter Collection mixtape.

Live performances
"You Rock My World" was performed twice live during the 30th anniversary concerts, which took place in late 2001. In the second concert, he was joined by Usher and Chris Tucker at the end, who danced with him.

Track listing

Personnel
 Written and composed by Michael Jackson, Darkchild.
 Produced and all musical instruments performed by Michael Jackson and Rodney Jerkins
 Lead and background vocals by Michael Jackson
 Intro by Chris Tucker and Michael Jackson
 Recorded by Brad Gilderman, Rodney Jerkins, Jean-Marie Horvat, Dexter Simmons and Stuart Brawley
 Digital editing by Harvey Mason Jr. and Stuart Brawley
 Mixed by Bruce Swedien, Lyndell Fraser, and Rodney Jerkins
 Starring Michael Jackson, Chris Tucker, Marlon Brando, Michael Madsen, Billy Drago, introducing Kishaya Dudley.
 Directed by Paul Hunter

Charts

Weekly charts

Year-end charts

Certifications

See also
List of Romanian Top 100 number ones of the 2000s

References

Bibliography

External links
 The music video for "You Rock My World" at YouTube.com

2001 songs
2001 singles
Michael Jackson songs
Songs written by Michael Jackson
Song recordings produced by Michael Jackson
Music videos directed by Paul Hunter (director)
Songs written by Rodney Jerkins
Songs written by Fred Jerkins III
Song recordings produced by Rodney Jerkins
Marlon Brando
SNEP Top Singles number-one singles
Number-one singles in Portugal
Number-one singles in Poland
Number-one singles in Spain
Number-one singles in Romania
Songs written by LaShawn Daniels
Epic Records singles